Silas Uriah Pinney (March 3, 1833April 1, 1899) was an American jurist and politician from Wisconsin.  He was a justice of the Wisconsin Supreme Court and the 13th Mayor of Madison, Wisconsin.

Biography

Born in Rockdale Township, Crawford County, Pennsylvania, Pinney moved with his family to Dane County, Wisconsin. Pinney began reading law in 1851 or 1852 in the offices of Vilas & Remington. He was admitted to the Wisconsin Bar in 1854 and became a partner in the reorganized law firm of Vilas, Roys & Pinney, which is known as Bell Moore & Richter SC today. In 1875, he was elected to the Wisconsin State Assembly and was elected Mayor of Madison, Wisconsin in 1874. In 1891, he was elected to the Wisconsin Supreme Court. Because of ill health, Pinney resigned from the court and died the next year. Prior to his own death, his one son, Clarence, died at age 20, and his daughter, Bessie, died in a carriage accident.

The Pinney Branch of the Madison Public Library was named in his honor. Madison's first public library opened in 1875 when Pinney was mayor.

Electoral history

Wisconsin Attorney General (1869)

| colspan="6" style="text-align:center;background-color: #e9e9e9;"| General Election, November 2, 1869

Wisconsin Supreme Court (1891)

| colspan="6" style="text-align:center;background-color: #e9e9e9;"| General Election, April 7, 1891

Notes

External links
 Bell Moore & Richter SC Homepage

1833 births
1899 deaths
People from Rockdale Township, Pennsylvania
Mayors of Madison, Wisconsin
Members of the Wisconsin State Assembly
Justices of the Wisconsin Supreme Court
19th-century American politicians
19th-century American judges